In enzymology, a N-acylglucosamine-6-phosphate 2-epimerase is an enzyme that catalyzes the chemical reaction

N-acyl-D-glucosamine 6-phosphate  N-acyl-D-mannosamine 6-phosphate

Hence, this enzyme has one substrate, N-acyl-D-glucosamine 6-phosphate, and one product, N-acyl-D-mannosamine 6-phosphate.

This enzyme belongs to the family of isomerases, specifically those racemases and epimerases acting on carbohydrates and derivatives.  The systematic name of this enzyme class is N-acyl-D-glucosamine-6-phosphate 2-epimerase. Other names in common use include acylglucosamine-6-phosphate 2-epimerase, and acylglucosamine phosphate 2-epimerase.  This enzyme participates in aminosugars metabolism.

Structural studies

References 

 

EC 5.1.3
Enzymes of known structure